Tyutyunikovo is a rural locality (a selo) in Alexeyevsky District, Belgorod Oblast, Russia. The population was 297 as of 2010. There are 8 streets.

Geography 
Tyutyunikovo is located 17 km southeast of Alexeyevka (the district's administrative centre) by road.

References 

Rural localities in Alexeyevsky District, Belgorod Oblast
Biryuchensky Uyezd